Fahrettin Cüreklibatır (7 September 1937 – 28 June 2022), better known by his stage name Cüneyt Arkın, was a Turkish film actor, director, producer and martial artist. Having starred in somewhere around 300 movies and TV series, he is widely considered one of the most prominent Turkish actors of all time. Arkın's films have ranged from well-received dramas to mockbusters throughout his career spanning four decades.

Early in his career, Arkın became known for starring in historical dramas taking place during the first centuries of the Ottoman Empire and Anatolian Seljuks, such as Malkoçoğlu Cem Sultan and Battal Gazi. While gaining success with such action-based films, he also took part in political films in the late 1970s, the most famous of those being The Adam Trilogy directed by Remzi Aydın Jöntürk. Arkın and Jöntürk continued their collaboration on many other films. Cüneyt Arkın and Fatma Girik are one of the most famous partnerships of Yeşilçam Turkish cinema. 

In the 1980s, Arkın became known abroad for the film Dünyayı Kurtaran Adam (The Man Who Saves The World, also known as Turkish Star Wars), a low-budget science fantasy martial arts film, tentatively famous for featuring bootlegged scenes from Star Wars. Today, the B movie has a cult following.

Career

While he was doing his military service as a reserve officer in his hometown of Eskişehir, he caught the attention of director Halit Refiğ during the filming of Şafak Bekçileri (1963) starring Göksel Arsoy. After completing his military service, he worked as a doctor in and around Adana.  In 1963, he won the first prize in the Artist magazine. Seeking a job for a while, Cüneyt Arkın started acting in 1963 with the offer of Halit Refiğ and translated at least 30 films in two years.

The fight scene in the end in film Gurbet Kuşları in 1964 was a breaking point in Arkın's career.  After playing emotional and romantic young characters for a while, he turned to action films with the suggestion of Halit Refiğ. During this period, he studied acrobatics at the Medrano Circus in Istanbul for six months. By transferring what he learned here in the Malkoçoğlu and Battal Gazi Destanı series to the big screen, he brought a unique style to Turkish cinema. He soon became the most sought-after actor in adventure films. Although he started his film career with romantic young heroes, he continued with action films, but almost every character died. Throughout his career, he shot various genres from western to comedy, from adventure movies to social movies. Especially, Maden (1978) and Vatandaş Rıza (1979) occupy a special place in Cüneyt Arkın's career.

Personal life 
Fahrettin Cüreklibatur was born on 8 September 1937, in the village of Gökçeoğlu in the Alpu district of Eskişehir Province, Turkey to a family of Crimean Tatar and Nogai origin.

After graduation from the university as a physician, Cüreklibatır married his classmate Dr. Güler Mocan in 1964. In 1966, their daughter Filiz Cüreklibatır was born. The marriage did not last long due to Cüreklibatır's newly flourishing career as a film actor.

In 1968, he took the stage name Cüneyt Arkın, and met Betül Işıl, the daughter of a wealthy family that owned a tile manufacturing company. Işıl, a graduate of a university in Switzerland was working as a flight attendant at the time. They were engaged in 1969, married in 1970, and divorced in 1971. Soon afterwards, they remarried and Betül gave birth to two sons, Murat and Kaan Polat. Arkın's wife and sons have starred in several of his films. His grandchildren are called Defne, Zeynep and Cemre. Cüneyt Arkın died at a hospital in Istanbul after suffering a cardiac arrest at home on 28 June 2022. On June 30, he was interred at Zincirlikuyu Cemetery. Following his death, the Beşiktaş municipal council voted to name the Artists' Park in Akatlar, Beşiktaş after him.

Awards

|-
| 1963
| "First Prize" (1.lik Ödülü")
| 
| 
|-
| 1969
| "Best Actor Award" ("En İyi Erkek Oyuncu Ödülü"), for 
| 
| 
|-
| 1972
| "Best Actor Award" ("En İyi Erkek Oyuncu Ödülü"), for 
| 
| 
|-
| 1976
| "Best Actor Award" ("En İyi Erkek Oyuncu Ödülü"), for | 
| 
|-
| 1999
| "Lifetime Honor Award" ("Yaşam Boyu Onur Ödülü")
| 
| 
|-
| rowspan="3" |2013
| "Lifetime Profession and Honor Award" ("Yaşam Boyu Meslek ve Onur Ödülü")
| Engelsiz Yaşam Vakfı| 
|-
| "Lifetime Honor Award" ("Yaşam Boyu Onur Ödülü")
| 
| 
|-
| "Culture and Art Grand Prize" ("Kültür ve Sanat Büyük Ödülü")
| 2013 Yılı Kültür ve Sanat Büyük Ödülü| 
|-
| 2021
| "Culture and Art Grand Prize" ("Kültür ve Sanat Büyük Ödülü"'')
| Presidential Culture and Arts Grand Awards
|

Filmography

References

Kalpaklı, Fatma. “Alageyik Filmi ile Avcı Filmindeki Geyik İmgesine Karşılaştırmalı bir Bakış”, 
RumeliDE Dil ve Edebiyat Araştırmaları Dergisi, 2021.  (Cilt, Sayı: 24), 1096-1112. DOI: 10.29000/rumelide.995493. 21.Eylül.2021.

External links
 
 Official Webpage 

1937 births
2022 deaths
Turkish male film actors
Turkish film directors
20th-century Turkish physicians
Istanbul University alumni
People from Eskişehir
Turkish expatriates in Iran
Best Actor Golden Orange Award winners
Best Actor Golden Boll Award winners
Golden Orange Life Achievement Award winners
Golden Butterfly Award winners
Turkish people of Crimean Tatar descent
Istanbul University Faculty of Medicine alumni
Turkish martial artists
Nogai people
Burials at Zincirlikuyu Cemetery